Prince Emanuele Filiberto Vittorio Eugenio Alberto Genova Giuseppe Maria di Savoia, 2nd Duke of Aosta (Spanish: Manuel Filiberto; 13 January 1869 – 4 July 1931) was an Italian general and member of the House of Savoy, as the son of Amadeo I, and was also a cousin of Victor Emmanuel III of Italy. 
Filiberto was also commander of the Italian Third Army during World War I, which earned him the title of the "Undefeated Duke". After the war he became a Marshal of Italy.

Biography
He was born in Genoa, the eldest son of Prince Amadeo of Savoy, Duke of Aosta (second son of King Vittorio Emanuele II) and his first wife Donna Maria Vittoria dal Pozzo della Cisterna. In 1870, Amadeo was elected King of Spain, but abdicated  and returned to Italy in 1873. Amadeo died in 1890, and Emanuele Filiberto succeeded as Duke of Aosta.

He began his career in the Italian Army at Naples, in 1905, as commander. During World War I, he commanded the Italian Third Army, which gained the nickname of Armata invitta ("undefeated army"). Following the war he was promoted to the rank of Marshal of Italy by Benito Mussolini in 1926.

Prince Emanuele Filiberto died in 1931 at Turin. In accordance and observance of his will, he was buried in the military cemetery of Redipuglia, together with thousands of soldiers of the Third Army.

Named after him were:
 the Duke of Aosta Bridge in Rome, built in 1942
 a bridge on the Piave at Jesolo, inaugurated in 1927
 a street in Rome
 the cruiser Emanuele Filiberto Duca d'Aosta, which was given to the Soviet Union after World War II

Family and children
He was married in 25 June 1895 to Princess Hélène of Orléans (1871–1951). She was a daughter of Prince Philippe of Orléans and the Infanta Maria Isabel of Spain.

They had two sons:
Amedeo, 3rd Duke of Aosta (21 October 1898 – 3 March 1942); married Princess Anne of Orléans with issue.
Aimone, 4th Duke of Aosta, who briefly reigned as King Tomislav II of Croatia (9 March 1900 – 29 January 1948); married Princess Irene of Greece and Denmark with issue.

Honours and awards
 :
 Knight of the Annunciation, 14 March 1890
 Grand Cross of Saints Maurice and Lazarus, 14 March 1890
 Grand Cross of the Crown of Italy, 14 March 1890
 Grand Cross of the Military Order of Savoy, 28 December 1916
 Gold Medal of Military Valour, 24 June 1937
   Austria-Hungary:
 Grand Cross of the Royal Hungarian Order of St. Stephen, 1895
 Knight of the Golden Fleece, 1899
 : Knight of the Black Eagle, 17 May 1893
  Siam: Knight of the Order of the Royal House of Chakri, 1 June 1897
   Sweden-Norway: Knight of the Seraphim, 18 September 1897
 : Stranger Knight of the Garter, 15 July 1902
 : Knight of the Rue Crown
 : Grand Cross of the Order of Charles III, with Collar, 28 December 1923

Ancestry

References

Encyclopædia Britannica (1950)

External links

Genealogy of the Royal House of Italy
Biography of the Duke of Aosta

|-

|-

|-

|-

1869 births
1931 deaths
Princes of Savoy
Dukes of Aosta
Dukes of Apulia
Nobility from Genoa
Princes della Cisterna
Military personnel from Genoa
Knights Grand Cross of the Order of Saints Maurice and Lazarus
Recipients of the Order of the Crown (Italy)
Knights Grand Cross of the Military Order of Savoy
Extra Knights Companion of the Garter
Knights of the Golden Fleece of Austria
Grand Crosses of the Order of Saint Stephen of Hungary
Field marshals of Italy
Italian generals
Italian military personnel of World War I
Nobility from Turin
Heirs apparent who never acceded
Recipients of the Gold Medal of Military Valor
Sons of kings